Shannon Rempel (born November 26, 1984) is a Canadian speed skater. An Olympic silver medalist from the 2006 Winter Olympics in the team pursuit. World Champion in the team pursuit from 2007 World Single Distance Championships, SLC, UT. Rempel also participated in the 2010 Vancouver Olympics, in the 500m, and 1000m distances. She specializes in the sprint and middle distances, capturing many podium finishes over the years at the World Cup events. Rempel is also known for her win as the 2003 World Junior Speed Skating Championships.

Previously she held the World Junior record in the 500m, and in the  combined sprint distances. Currently she still holds the Canadian Jr. records in the 500m and 1000m.

Shannon signed a flag which was brought up to the international space station.

Biography

Early life
Rempel was born in Winnipeg, Manitoba. She was introduced to speed skating at age 10 at the St. James Speed Skating Club when her friend  suggested that she try it.

References

External links
Results of Shannon Rempel

1984 births
Living people
Speed skaters from Winnipeg
Speed skaters at the 2006 Winter Olympics
Speed skaters at the 2010 Winter Olympics
Olympic speed skaters of Canada
Olympic silver medalists for Canada
Olympic medalists in speed skating
Canadian female speed skaters
Medalists at the 2006 Winter Olympics
Canadian Mennonites